John Franklin McGee (January 1, 1861 – February 15, 1925) was a United States district judge of the United States District Court for the District of Minnesota.

Education and career

Born in Amboy, Illinois, McGee read law to enter the bar in 1882. He was in private practice in Devils Lake, Dakota Territory (now North Dakota) from 1883 to 1887, and in Minneapolis, Minnesota from 1887 to 1897. He was a Judge of the Fourth Judicial District of Minnesota from 1897 to 1902, thereafter returning to private practice in Minneapolis until 1923.

Federal judicial service

On February 28, 1923, McGee was nominated by President Warren G. Harding to a new seat on the United States District Court for the District of Minnesota created by 42 Stat. 837. He was confirmed by the United States Senate on March 2, 1923, and received his commission the same day. McGee served in that capacity until February 15, 1925, when he committed suicide with a revolver in his chambers. He left a note stating that he was suffering exhaustion and  depression due to his heavy workload. His seat was abolished upon his death as it had been established as a temporary judgeship.

References

Sources
 

1861 births
1925 deaths
1925 suicides
20th-century American judges
Judges of the United States District Court for the District of Minnesota
Minnesota state court judges
People from Amboy, Illinois
Suicides by firearm in Minnesota
United States district court judges appointed by Warren G. Harding
United States federal judges admitted to the practice of law by reading law